Kirkjubøur is the southernmost village on Streymoy, Faroe Islands. The village is located on the south-west coast of Streymoy and has a view towards the islands of Hestur and Koltur towards the west, and to Sandoy towards the south. It lies south of the new ferry port of Gamlarætt, which opened in 1993.

The village is the Faroes' most important historical site, with the ruins of the Magnus Cathedral from around 1300, Saint Olav's Church (Olavskirkjan), from the 12th century and the old farmhouse of Kirkjubøargarður from the 11th century. In 1832, a runestone was found near the Magnus Cathedral in Kirkjubøur. The stone which is referred to as the Kirkjubøur stone dates back to the Viking Age.

The little islet just of the coast, Kirkjubøhólmur, contains an eiderduck colony. To the village belongs the islet of Trøllhøvdi, just 100m off the northern tip of Sandoy 9 km away from Kirkjubøur. It was given as payment to the villagers, as it was their duty to ferry people across to Sandoy in medieval times.

History
The village was important in the Middle Ages. At that time it was the episcopal residence for the Diocese of the Faroe Islands and as such the spiritual centre of the society. In those days the village is said to have had around 50 houses. The majority of these houses were washed away by a fierce storm in the 16th century, which created the islet Kirkjubøhólmurin, which contains ruins from that time. It is speculated that the church located the diocese in Kirkjubø, to counter the heathen Vé in Velbastaður only 5 km to the north west up the coast.

There are three main attractions from this time:
 Magnus Cathedral  ruins from about 1300.
 Saint Olav's Church, the oldest still used church of the Faroes dating from 12th century.
Kirkjubøargarður, the oldest still inhabited wooden house of the world from 11th century.

Notable residents
Sverre I of Norway (1151–1202), grew up here.
Bishop Erlendur (?-1308), who built the Magnus Cathedral and wrote the Sheep letter, the oldest document of the country.
Súsanna Helena Patursson (1864–1916), first feminist of the Faroes.
Jóannes Patursson (1866–1946), nationalist leader and writer.
Sverri Patursson (1871–1960),  writer, journalist and environmentalist.
Erlendur Patursson (1913–1986), writer and nationalist politician.
Tróndur Patursson (b. 1944), artist and adventurer.

Kirkjubøur chairs
The medieval carved pew ends from Saint Olav's Church are now to be found in the National Museum of the Faroe Islands. These were featured in three series of Faroese stamps, engraved by Czeslaw Slania. For the full series, see here.

Gallery

See also
 List of towns in the Faroe Islands

References

External links
Faroeislands.dk: Kirkjubøur Images and description of all cities on the Faroe Islands.
Kirkjubøur, Faroe Islands: A Taste of Local History on Streymoy

Populated places in the Faroe Islands
Tórshavn